Thomas Moriarty (1812, Dingle – 1894, Tralee) was a priest in the Church of Ireland  during the nineteenth century.

Moriarty was educated at Trinity College, Dublin.  Moriarty was ordained in 1837. He served curacies at Kingscourt and Ventry; and incumbencies at Dunquin, Kildrum, Tralee, Ballynacourty and Drishane. He was Treasurer of Ardfert Cathedral from 1873 to 1879; and Dean of Ardfert from 1879 to 1894.

He died on 26 April 1894.

References

Deans of Ardfert
Alumni of Trinity College Dublin
1812 births
1894 deaths
People from Dingle